"Cold Dead Hand" is a single and accompanying music video created for Funny or Die by comedian Jim Carrey with The Eels, playing as "Lonesome Earl and the Clutterbusters". The title is a reference to a statement Charlton Heston made while acting as spokesperson for the National Rifle Association, "I'll give you my gun when you pry (or take) it from my cold, dead hands." The song ridicules American gun culture, and specifically the deceased Heston, including a derisive caricature of him and declaring that he could not enter Heaven, as even the angels could not pry the gun from his hands. Staged as an episode of the variety program Hee Haw in which Heston is a guest star, the video also features The Eels dressed as Abraham Lincoln, Mahatma Gandhi, and John Lennon. The single marks the Eels' first release since their album Wonderful, Glorious earlier in 2013.

The novelty song evoked strong responses in conservative media for several reasons, including the repeated implication by Carrey that gun obsession is related to American male phallus-size anxiety.

References

External links
Cold Dead Hand at Funny or Die
Cold Dead Hand at iTunes

Novelty songs
2013 songs
Eels (band) songs
2013 singles
American country music songs
Songs about actors
Political songs
Satirical songs
Black comedy music
Comedy songs